The Sri Lanka women's national volleyball team represents Sri Lanka in international women's volleyball competitions and friendly matches.

It appeared at the Women's Asian Volleyball Championship 9 times, its best position was 10th place at the 2007 event.

Team
The following is the roster for the 2017 Asian Women's Volleyball Championship.

Head coach: Sumith Jayalal

References

External links
Sri Lanka Volleyball Federation

National women's volleyball teams
Volleyball in Sri Lanka
Women's national sports teams of Sri Lanka